Higher education in Denmark is offered by a range of universities, university colleges, business academies and specialised institutions. The national higher education system is in accordance with the Bologna Process, with bachelor's degrees (first cycle, three years), master's degrees (second cycle, two years) and doctoral degrees (third cycle, three years). The majority of higher education institutions are the responsibility of the Ministry of Higher Education and Science; however, some higher education institutions within the arts are the responsibility of the Ministry of Culture.

System

Admission
The general entry requirement for acceptance to higher education is a Danish upper secondary school leaving certificate or equivalent. Individual programmes also have specific entry requirements, such as mathematics at a specific level, and language requirements in Danish or English or both. Admission at first cycle programmes in Denmark is coordinated centrally by the Ministry of Higher Education and Science. Admission to master's programmes and doctoral programmes is done at each individual university.

Structure and grading
Higher education in Denmark is structured according to the ECTS. A normal study progression awards 60 ECTS-points per year (30 per semester), most institutions use a block system of either 5, 7.5 or 10 ECTS-points. Academic grading in Denmark is done according to the 7-point grading scale, equalling the seven grades in the ECTS grading scale.

Institutions
Institutions of higher education in Denmark are divided into five categories: business academies, university colleges, institutions in architecture and art, maritime educational institutions and universities.

Universities
There are eight state-recognized and funded universities in Denmark, offering research-based education and awarding bachelor's, master's, and doctoral degrees. Below the list of these universities in chronological order of established:
University of Copenhagen (1479–), headquartered in Copenhagen, but also has facilities in Frederiksberg, Taastrup, Helsingør, Hørsholm, and Nødebo
Technical University of Denmark (1829–), located in Kongens Lyngby 
Copenhagen Business School (1917–), located in Frederiksberg
Aarhus University  (1928–), headquartered in  Aarhus, but also has facilities in Copenhagen, Roskilde, Silkeborg, Foulum and Herning
Roskilde University (1972–), located in Roskilde
Aalborg University  (1974–), headquartered in Aalborg, but also has facilities in Copenhagen and Esbjerg
University of Southern Denmark  (1998–), headquartered in Odense, but also has facilities in Kolding, Sønderborg, Esbjerg, Slagelse and Copenhagen
IT University of Copenhagen (1999–), located in Copenhagen

Institutions in architecture and art
There are nine higher education institutions in Denmark teaching architecture and arts:
 Royal Danish Academy of Fine Arts, Copenhagen (1754–)
 Royal Danish Academy of Music, Frederiksberg (1825–)
 Royal Academy of Music, Aarhus and Aalborg (1927–)
 Aarhus School of Architecture, Aarhus (1965–)
 The National Film School of Denmark, Copenhagen (1966–)   
 Design School Kolding, Kolding (1967–)
 Rhythmic Music Conservatory, Copenhagen (1986–)
 Danish National Academy of Music, Odense and Esbjerg (2015–)
 The Danish National School of Performing Arts, Copenhagen (2015–)

University colleges
There are eight university colleges in Denmark awarding professional bachelor's degrees:
KEA - Copenhagen School of Design and Technology, Copenhagen (2009–)
Danish School of Media and Journalism, Aarhus (1971–)
 University College Absalon, Sorø (2007–)
 Metropolitan University College, Copenhagen (2008–)
 University College Copenhagen, Copenhagen (2008–)
 University College Lillebaelt, Vejle (2008–)
 University College of Northern Denmark, Aalborg (2008–)
 VIA University College, Aarhus (2008–)
 University College South Denmark, Esbjerg (2011–)
 The Necessary Teacher Training College, Ulfborg (1972–)

Business academies 
There are nine business academies in Denmark offering two-year academy profession programmes and, to a lesser extent, professional bachelor's degrees:

IBA International Business Academy, Kolding (1991–)
 Business Academy Aarhus, Aarhus (2009–)
 Business Academy of higher education MidWest, Herning and Holstebro (2009–)
 Copenhagen Business Academy, Copenhagen (2009–)
 Danish Academy of Business and Technology (Dania Academy), Randers  (2009–)
 EA Business Academy SouthWest, Esbjerg and Sønderborg (2009–)
 Lillebaelt Academy, Odense and Vejle (2009–)
 Zealand Institute of Business and Technology, Køge (2009–)

Maritime educational institutions
There are three maritime educational institutions in Denmark:
 Copenhagen School of Marine Engineering and Technology Management, Copenhagen (1906–)
 Aarhus School of Marine and Technical Engineering, Aarhus
 Fredericia Maskinmesterskole, Fredericia

Former universities and colleges
The following is a list of former universities and colleges in Denmark: 
Royal Veterinary and Agricultural University, Frederiksberg (1856–2007)
Pharmaceutical College, Copenhagen (1892–1942)
 Aarhus School of Business, Aarhus (1939–2007)
Danish Pharmaceutical College, Copenhagen (1942–2003)
 Royal School of Library and Information Science, Copenhagen and Aalborg (1956–2013)
Odense University, Odense (1966–1998)
Danish University of Pharmaceutical Science, Copenhagen (2003–2007)
 University College South; it had facilities in Kolding, Haderslev, Aabenraa, and Sønderborg (2008–2011)
 West Jutland University College, Esbjerg (2008–2011)

Student welfare and economics
There are no tuition fees for attending public higher education in Denmark, as all costs are covered by the Danish state. Citizens of EU and EEA countries have equal rights and do not pay tuition fee to study at public institutions of higher education in Denmark.

Students are also given the opportunity to apply for financial support from the State Educational Grant and Loan Scheme (SU), normally referred to as "SU". Foreign citizens may apply for equal status with Danish citizens and thus be approved to receive SU.

International rankings

Below are shown the international rankings of the government supported research universities of Denmark, and the number of times they rank in the top 200 of one of the six prominent global rankings:

Notes:
N.A.: Not Applicable
a Number of times the university is ranked within the top 200 of one of the six global rankings. 
b The university is ranked within the top 150 of all six global rankings. 
c The university is ranked within the top 100 of all six global rankings.

See also
Lists of universities and colleges by country
Lists of universities and colleges
List of schools in Denmark
 Open access in Denmark
 University of Greenland

Notes

References

External links
 Danish universities listed at the official government site Study in Denmark Comprehensive list of universities and higher education institutions in Denmark

 
Universities
Denmark
Denmark